Alienopterus brachyelytrus is an extinct insect described from a 99 million year old fossil found in Burmese amber from the Hukawng Valley of Myanmar. It was the first known member of the order Alienoptera until 2018, when the second and third members of the order, Caputoraptor elegans, and Alienopterella stigmatica were described. A. brachyelytrus has characters that are shared with cockroaches and mantids and is thought to represent either the sister taxon, or an ancestor to mantids.

Alienopterus has shortened forewings and functional hindwings capable of flight that are attached to pads as in the Mantophasmatodea. The foreleg has a femoral brush which is a characteristic of Mantodea. The mouth points downward from the body axis and has biting mouthparts suggestive of a predator. The antenna is long and there are large compound eyes as well as three ocelli on the head (which is never found in the Blattodea).

See also
 Manipulator, an extinct cockroach that have characters similar to mantids

References

Prehistoric insect genera
Burmese amber
Fossil taxa described in 2016
Cenomanian life
Dictyoptera